is a Japanese field hockey player. At the 2012 Summer Olympics she competed with the Japan women's national field hockey team in the women's tournament.

References

External links
 

1987 births
Living people
Field hockey players at the 2012 Summer Olympics
Olympic field hockey players of Japan
Japanese female field hockey players
Sportspeople from Tottori Prefecture